Mahogany Air is a Zambian regional airline based in Lusaka with its hub at Lusaka International Airport. Mahogany Air has its corporate headquarters at East Park Mall, Great East Road, Lusaka.

History
Mahogany Air is a privately owned airline which was founded in 2013 by molecular scientist Jim Belemu and which began operations in 2016.

Destinations
Mahogany Air flies domestic routes to Livingstone, Mansa, Ndola, and Solwezi and regional routes to Lubumbashi in the Democratic Republic of the Congo.

Fleet

References

External links
Official website

Airlines of Zambia
Airlines established in 2014
Companies based in Lusaka